Mark Anthony Dunbar (born 1 June 1961) is a male retired British wrestler.

Wrestling career
Dunbar competed at the 1980 Summer Olympics and the 1984 Summer Olympics. He represented England and won a bronze medal in the 48kg light flyweight division, at the 1978 Commonwealth Games in Edmonton, Alberta, Canada. Four years later he represented England again but in the 62kg featherweight division, where he finished in fifth place, at the 1982 Commonwealth Games in Brisbane, Queensland, Australia.

References

1961 births
Living people
British male sport wrestlers
Olympic wrestlers of Great Britain
Wrestlers at the 1980 Summer Olympics
Wrestlers at the 1984 Summer Olympics
Sportspeople from Blackburn
Wrestlers at the 1978 Commonwealth Games
Wrestlers at the 1982 Commonwealth Games
Commonwealth Games bronze medallists for England
Commonwealth Games medallists in wrestling
Medallists at the 1978 Commonwealth Games